Peppi Borza (22 October 1936 – 24 July 1990) was a British-American dancer, entertainer, songwriter, composer, actor, and circus performer.

Early life 

Born to a circus performing family and brought up in Sarasota, Florida, Peppi performed in a double act with his sister Nita. They were acrobats and performed with the likes of Sammy Davis Jr., Jack Benny and Judy Garland, as well as appearing twice on The Ed Sullivan Show. One of their acts was Stars of the Future, a balancing and tumbling act with Polack Bros. Circus.

Singer/Songwriter 

Having been told by many people including Sammy Davis Jr. that he had a good voice, Peppi decided to become a singer. This led to him coming to England, setting up the group Peppi and the New York Twisters, and performing in England, Ireland and New York.

Despite recording several singles including The Skip (an attempt to start a new dance craze) and Pistol Packin' Mama, the singing career didn't pan out as expected.

He also performed at The Cavern Club in Liverpool, teaching a young Cilla Black how to dance the Twist, having learnt himself from Chubby Checker. The dance was the inspiration behind his former group.

In Britain, Borza became a long-time friend of singer Dusty Springfield (having first met The Springfields when they toured with Del Shannon), accompanying her on tours, as well as being a dancer on Ready Steady Go!. As the partner of her brother Tom, he participated in the composition of four songs with him: No Tears for Johnnie, Chain Gang Blues, The Skip and O Holy Child (which Dusty recorded in 1964 as a Christmas charity single for Barnardo's). In 1965, Peppi co-wrote Matt Monro's single Before You Go.

He also worked as a composer on Dusty Springfield's The Christmas Album and several other projects, including with Matt Monro.

Theatre and Screen 

Peppi made a name for himself on stage in London and New York, appearing on Broadway in the original cast recording of Evita. He played a Muleteer in the original West End production of Man of La Mancha as well as the 1972 film version and appeared in Intimate Games (1976). His other roles include a pirate in the 1976 musical Peter Pan and a policeman in Gilbert and Sullivan's 1983 musical The Pirates of Penzance as well as playing a Vervoid in parts 11 and 12 of the Doctor Who saga The Trial of a Time Lord (segment: Terror of the Vervoids). He was in the 1985 cast of On Your Toes at the Palace Theatre, London.

Among Peppi's final work was appearing in the 1987 West End revival of Follies.

Death 

Borza died from AIDS. Dusty frequently visited him at the hospice, which cared for him towards the end of his life. Borza left money to his closest friend in his will.

References

External links

Peppi Borza at Theatricalia
Peppi Borza at British Film Institute

1936 births
1990 deaths
Deaths from AIDS-related illness
British composers
British songwriters
British male television actors
British male film actors
British circus performers
British dancers